Eumodicogryllus is a genus of crickets in the family Gryllidae and tribe Modicogryllini.  
Species in this genus are similar to - and were originally considered a subgenus of - Modicogryllus (Eumodicogryllus); they have been recorded from: Europe, northern Africa and temperate Asia.

Species 
The Orthoptera Species File includes:
 Eumodicogryllus bordigalensis (Latreille, 1804)
  type species (as Gryllus bordigalensis Latreille) is:subspecies E. bordigalensis bordigalensis (Latreille, 1804)
 subspecies E. bordigalensis turcomanorum (Semenov, 1915)
 Eumodicogryllus chivensis (Tarbinsky, 1930)
 Eumodicogryllus theryi (Chopard, 1943)

References

External links
 

Ensifera genera
crickets
Orthoptera of Asia
Orthoptera of Africa
Orthoptera of Europe